Brunswick Rock is a 19th-century name for an obstruction in the Pearl River a little above the First Bar. It received its name after the East Indiaman  grounded there in 1798. All were refloated. Then in September 1815 the country ship  was wrecked on the Brunswick Rock; her crew were rescued. At the time she was on a voyage from Bengal, India to China.

During the First Opium War, the British Royal Navy defeated the Qing dynasty Imperial Chinese Navy in the Battle of First Bar in the vicinity.

Citations

References

External links
1909 map of Canton River, showing the Brunswick Patches

Pearl River (China)
Geography of China